Rajendra Banhatti (Devanagari: राजेन्द्र बनहट्टी) is a Marathi writer from Maharashtra, India. He is the son of famous Marathi writer and biographer Shrinivas Narayan Banhatti. He has completed his MA in English and MA in Psychology. He was the director of Suvichar Publishing House in Pune. Banhatti has been awarded the Maharashtra State Literary Award four times for his books.

He was the president of Maharashtra Sahitya Parishad and also the member of Akhil Bhartiya Marathi Sahitya Mahamandal. He presided over Marathi Sahitya Sammelan in Pune in 2002.

Works
Novels
अखेरचे आत्मचरित्र 
अपूर्णा
मरणानंतरचे मरण 
त्रैराशिक

Short Story Collections
समानधर्मा
गंगार्पण
कृष्णजन्म
खेळ
अवेळ
लांडगा
युद्धपर्व
प्रेक्षक
राजेन्द्र बनहट्टी यांच्या निवडक लघुकथा (Compilation by श्रीराम शिधये)

Sources 
http://www.thehoot.org/web/home/searchdetail.php?sid=506&bg=1
http://www.dilipprabhawalkar.com/v1/awards1.htm

Marathi-language writers
Living people
Presidents of the Akhil Bharatiya Marathi Sahitya Sammelan
Year of birth missing (living people)